1529 Oterma, provisional designation , is a reddish, rare-type Hildian asteroid from the outermost region of the asteroid belt, approximately 56 kilometers in diameter. It was discovered on 26 January 1938, by Finnish astronomer Yrjö Väisälä at Turku Observatory in Southwest Finland. It is named for Liisi Oterma.

Orbit and classification 

Oterma is a member of the Hilda family, a large group of asteroids that orbit in resonance with the gas giant Jupiter. Hildian asteroids are thought to have originated from the Kuiper belt in the outer Solar System.

It orbits the Sun in the outer main-belt at a distance of 3.2–4.8 AU once every 7 years and 12 months (2,914 days). Its orbit has an eccentricity of 0.20 and an inclination of 9° with respect to the ecliptic.

The body's observation arc begins at Turku a few weeks after its official discovery observation.

Physical characteristics 

Oterma belongs to an exclusive group of 33 known asteroids with a spectral P-type in the Tholen classification scheme.

Photometry 

During a study of 47 Hilda asteroids in the 1990s, a rotational lightcurve of Oterma was obtained from photometric observations at the Swedish Uppsala Astronomical Observatory and other places. It gave a rotation period of 15.75 hours with a change in brightness of 0.18 magnitude.

Diameter and albedo 

According to the space-based surveys carried out by NASA's Wide-field Infrared Survey Explorer with its subsequent NEOWISE mission and by the Japanese Akari satellite, Oterma measures 56.33 and 60.1 kilometers in diameter and its surface has an albedo of 0.054 and 0.047, respectively. The Collaborative Asteroid Lightcurve Link assumes a standard albedo for carbonaceous asteroids of 0.057 and calculates a diameter of 54.40 kilometers, with an absolute magnitude of 10.05.

Naming 

Oterma was named for Liisi Oterma (1915–2001), first Finnish female astronomer with a PhD and a discoverer of minor planets and comets at the Turku observatory between 1939 and 1953. The official  was published by the Minor Planet Center on 20 February 1976.

References

External links 
 Asteroid Lightcurve Database (LCDB), query form (info )
 Dictionary of Minor Planet Names, Google books
 Asteroids and comets rotation curves, CdR – Observatoire de Genève, Raoul Behrend
 Discovery Circumstances: Numbered Minor Planets (1)-(5000) – Minor Planet Center
 
 

001529
Discoveries by Yrjö Väisälä
Named minor planets
001529
19380126